"Sweet Somebody" is the fourth single from freestyle singer Shannon's debut album Let the Music Play.

Track listing
Germany 12" single

UK 12" Single

Charts

References

1984 singles
Shannon (singer) songs
Song recordings produced by Chris Barbosa
1984 songs